Ralph "Rolf" Olinger (17 December 1924 – 25 June 2006) was a Swiss alpine skier who competed in the 1948 Winter Olympics.

He was born in Engelberg.

In 1948 he won a bronze medal in the downhill competition.

References

External links
 Profile

Swiss male alpine skiers
Olympic alpine skiers of Switzerland
Alpine skiers at the 1948 Winter Olympics
Olympic bronze medalists for Switzerland
Olympic medalists in alpine skiing
Medalists at the 1948 Winter Olympics
1924 births
2006 deaths
20th-century Swiss people